Artur Amirov (born April 3, 1992) is a Russian professional ice hockey player who currently plays for Metallurg Novokuznetsk in the Kontinental Hockey League (KHL).

Amirov made his Kontinental Hockey League (KHL) debut playing with Lokomotiv Yaroslavl during the 2010–11 KHL season.

References

External links

1992 births
Living people
People from Almetyevsk
Lokomotiv Yaroslavl players
Metallurg Novokuznetsk players
HC Neftekhimik Nizhnekamsk players
Russian ice hockey defencemen
Sportspeople from Tatarstan